Thaumatomyrmex is a Neotropical genus of ants in the subfamily Ponerinae, found from Mexico to Brazil. They are notable for their pitchfork-shaped mandibles, which they use to capture millipedes of the order Polyxenida. The genus is a specialist predator of polyxenids, and one of only two ant genera known to prey upon polyxenids.

Taxonomy and phylogenetics

The genus was established by Mayr in 1877 to house the single species Thaumatomyrmex mutilatus, discovered in Brazil. Since its inception, the genus has been placed in various tribes: Ectatommini, Ponerini, Cylindromyrmicini, and its own tribe, Thaumatomyrmecini. Molecular phylogeny by Schmidt & Shattuck (2014) confirmed that the genus is nested within Ponerini. Twelve species has been described, and a few undescribed taxa are known.

Distribution
Thaumatomyrmex is found only in the Neotropics, from Mexico to Brazil (including Cuba and other Caribbean islands). The genus was once thought to be rare, but with better sampling techniques, the ants are now found more frequently.

Description
Workers are small in size (3.3–5.0 mm) and have pitchfork-shaped mandibles with three long teeth. They are specialist predators of millipedes of the order Polyxenida. Polyxenids are an unusual type of prey, only known to be preyed upon by Thaumatomyrmex and Probolomyrmex ants. The millipedes are covered with hooked bristle setae, which entangles potential predators. Thaumatomyrmex use their long mandibles to hold the polyxenids before immobilizing them by stinging, and then stripping the prey from their protective setae. The brush-like hairs on the workers' legs are used to scrape the setae off "like cleaning a chicken". Workers forage individually in the leaf litter.

Alate queens remain undescribed, although Kempf (1975) mentioned an alate T. zeteki queen in the collections of the U.S. National Museum, this has however never been confirmed. Gamergates (reproductive female workers) are known from at least two species (T. atrox and T. contumax).

Species

Thaumatomyrmex atrox Weber, 1939
Thaumatomyrmex bariay Fontenla Rizo, 1995
Thaumatomyrmex cochlearis Creighton, 1928
Thaumatomyrmex contumax Kempf, 1975
Thaumatomyrmex ferox Mann, 1922
Thaumatomyrmex mandibularis Baroni Urbani & De Andrade, 2003
Thaumatomyrmex manni Weber, 1939
Thaumatomyrmex mutilatus Mayr, 1887
Thaumatomyrmex nageli Baroni Urbani & De Andrade, 2003
Thaumatomyrmex paludis Weber, 1942
Thaumatomyrmex soesilae Makhan, 2007
Thaumatomyrmex zeteki Smith, 1944

References

External links

Ponerinae
Ant genera
Hymenoptera of North America
Hymenoptera of South America